One for the Road is a 2021 Thai-language drama film directed by Nattawut Poonpiriya and produced by Wong Kar-wai. It is a Chinese/Hong Kong/Thai co-production, and is written by Puangsoi Aksornsawang, Nottapon Boonprakob and Nattawut Poonpiriya. The film stars  Thanapob Leeratanakajorn, Nattarat Nopparatayapon, Ploy Horwang, Siraphun Wattanajinda, Violette Wautier and Chutimon Chuengcharoensukying. 

The film had its world premiere at the 2021 Sundance Film Festival on January 28, 2021 and won the Special Jury Award for Creative Vision in the World Cinema Dramatic Competition. The film was selected as the Thai entry for Best International Feature Film at the 95th Academy Awards.

Cast
The cast include:
 Thanapob Leeratanakajorn as Boss
 Nattarat Nopparatayapon as Aood
 Violette Wautier as Prim
 Chutimon Chuengcharoensukying as Noona
 Ploi Horwang as Alice
 Noon Siraphun as Roong

Release
The film had its world premiere at the 2021 Sundance Film Festival on January 28, 2021.

In 2022, the Thai distribution rights to the film were acquired by GDH 559 and it set to be released in Thai cinemas on February 10.

Critical response 
On Rotten Tomatoes, the film has an approval rating of 65% based on reviews from 31 critics, with an average rating of 6.4/10. The website's critics consensus reads, "It's overlong and uneven, but One for the Road may still satisfy viewers in the mood for a road trip movie with mortality on its mind."

See also
 List of Thai submissions for the Academy Award for Best International Feature Film
 List of submissions to the 95th Academy Awards for Best International Feature Film

References

External links
 
 

Thai-language films
Thai drama films
2021 drama films
Sundance Film Festival award winners